William VII of Chalon (born  1415, died 1475) was a prince of Orange and lord of Arlay.  He was the son of Louis II lord of Arlay and his wife Johanna of Montfaucon.

He was married to Catherine of Brittany, the sister of Francis II, Duke of Brittany.  Together, they had one son:
 John IV of Chalon.

Ancestors

Footnotes

Chalon-Arlay
Princes of Orange
1410s births
1475 deaths
Year of birth uncertain